Kangarlu or Kangarloo may refer to:
 Kangarlu, Ardabil
 Kangarlu, West Azerbaijan
 Kangarlu, Zanjan